Calton Hill is a Site of Special Scientific Interest in Derbyshire, England, showing Olivine Diorite magma chamber.

It is the site of an extinct volcano and the quarrying that has now been abandoned means that it is possible to observe the geological structures caused by the repeated eruptions. The eruptions were small and were then underwater as Derbyshire was covered by a sea in the Carboniferous period (around 330 million years ago).

The nearest place is Blackwell and the nearest town is Buxton to the west.

References

External links
 Mineralogy of Calton Hill
 A Walk to Calton Hill

Sites of Special Scientific Interest in Derbyshire